2GO or 2GO Sea Solutions, also known as 2GO Travel, is a passenger ferry company based in Manila, Philippines, the shipping and passenger ferry arm of 2GO Group, and the only remaining Manila-based major interisland passenger ferry company, with its main hub located in Pier 4 at the Manila North Harbor.

The company was formed in 2012 following a significant realignment of ferry transportation in the Philippines in which the brands SuperFerry, Cebu Ferries and SuperCat under the Aboitiz Transport System was purchased by Negros Navigation for US$105 million. At the same time, a unit of China-Asean Investment Cooperation Fund, a Netherlands-based, private equity firm wholly owned by the Chinese government, took a controlling stake in Negros Navigation through an equity infusion. Because Negros Navigation was a privately held firm the exact amount invested by the Fund was not disclosed.

2GO, previously as a logistics arm of Aboitiz Transport System, is now one of the major operator of inter-island vessels in the country, which as of mid-2021 has a total of 10 operating vessels. It has a total passenger capacity of 7,450,162 passengers and an aggregate cargo capacity of 338,305 twenty-foot equivalent units.

History

SuperFerry

SuperFerry, founded as Aboitiz Shipping Company, later Aboitiz SuperFerry was one of the largest ferry companies in the Philippines before it was purchased by Negros Navigation. The shipping company was known in the 1990s as William, Gothong & Aboitiz (WG&A Philippines), where the latter eventually bought the entire shares of WG&A consortium from William Lines and Gothong Lines Group leaving the full control of the company to Aboitiz. The Gothong Group restarted its own shipping company called Carlos A. Gothong Lines (CAGLI), while the William Group opted to concentrate on its logistics, warehousing, and courier business, called Fast Logistics. SuperFerry and its sister companies SuperCat and Cebu Ferries were eventually merged with Negros Navigation where the latter bought all the shares of Aboitiz Transport System and relaunched in 2012 as 2GO Travel. The SuperFerry brand was subsequently retired after the merger.

Negros Navigation

Negros Navigation Co., Inc. (NENACO) was one of the oldest domestic shipping companies in the Philippines. It was organized and registered with the Securities and Exchange Commission (SEC) on July 26, 1932, for the purpose of transporting passengers and cargo at ports of call in the Philippines. In the 1960s Nenaco was the first among the domestic shipping companies to operate brand new, fast, and luxurious air-conditioned passenger ships. Throughout the 1970s & 1980s, NENACO constructed and operated a modern passenger terminal in Manila's North Harbor and pioneered in offering special cruises to the Philippine tourist spots using its coastwise vessels. Nenaco also launched its containerization program and ushered a new industry trend on the use of roll-on roll-off (“RORO”) vessels. It used to deploy shuttle buses in Baclaran, Cubao and Alabang which takes passengers to the pier terminal.

In the 1990s, Nenaco became the first Philippine shipping company to be listed in the stock exchange. Proceeds amounting to P916.86 million from the initial public offering (IPO) were used to support the “Globalization Program” of the company that involved fleet expansion and service modernization because of the investments in those years, Negros Navigation soon became one of the largest transport-related companies in the Philippines.

NENACO later merged with SuperCat, SuperFerry and Cebu Ferries to form 2GO Travel, the second time major Philippine shipping companies merged after the William Lines-Gothong Lines-Aboitiz Shipping merger (WG&A) in 1996.  At the same time, the China-Asean Investment Cooperation Fund, a private equity fund wholly-owned the government of the People's Republic of China through an equity infusion gained a controlling interest in Negros Navigation and subsequently changed the company into the 2GO Group with 2GO Travel its shipping-company subsidiary. The 'NENACO' brand was eventually retired in mid-2012.

Destinations
The following ports of call are served by 2GO. Many of these routes were previously served by either SuperFerry or Negros Navigation: (as of April 2022)

Luzon
Manila
Batangas City
Romblon, Romblon
Odiongan, Romblon
Puerto Princesa
Coron, Palawan
Visayas
Bacolod
Caticlan, Malay, Aklan (gateway to Boracay)
Cebu City
Dumaguete
Iloilo City
Jagna, Bohol
Ormoc City, Leyte (suspended)
Roxas City
Tacloban City, Leyte (suspended)
Tagbilaran City, Bohol
Mindanao
Butuan (via Nasipit)
Cagayan de Oro
Davao City (cargo only)
Dipolog
Iligan City, Lanao del Norte (suspended)
Ozamiz City, Misamis Occidental
Zamboanga City

Fleet
2GO acquired vessels from the remnants of former shipping companies: SuperFerry, SuperCat, Negros Navigation and Cebu Ferries. The vessels used to carry names derived from Roman Catholic saints until recently where newer vessels were named from certain "Ma" words with 2GO prefix that describes the positive attitudes of being a Filipino (e.g. 2GO Maligaya, 2GO Masagana, etc.). The routes shown below are the ships' default route assignments. The ships may be assigned to other routes when needed.

Roll-on/roll-off Ferries

Cargo vessels
2GO also operates dedicated cargo vessels alongside its passenger ships:

Liveries
2GO's livery has undergone several revisions throughout its history. Despite the differences in the design, all of their ships were painted with their company colors: white and magenta.

2012-2017

Their first livery is composed of an all-white color dominating the ship with the funnel/s and the waterline painted with magenta. The sides of the hull featured the “2GO Travel” branding as well as the then company's signature logo, a large stylized letter “G” painted near the bow and to the funnel. The decks were painted light blue.

A special version of this livery was briefly used on one of their vessel, MV "St. Ignatius of Loyola". This special livery features a wave-like shape on the bow and on the stern, with several shapes of birds, ball, star, and maskara and is added to the bow, also with the stern section featuring the phrase "Sarap Maglakbay! (traveling is fun!)".

2017-present
2GO revised its livery during this time to a much cleaner and simpler design. Although similar to its previous livery with the ships featuring an all-white livery dominating the hull and the superstructure, this time the funnel which is previously painted with magenta, is now painted in white. The “2GO Travel” branding which is previously seen on the hull was revised to feature only the word “2GO” and is now painted also to the funnel. The large letter “G” was omitted making the livery much simpler. The waterline and the deck retained their original colors. This livery is currently used on all of 2GO's vessels prior to its new acquisitions in 2021.

2GO Maligaya & 2GO Masagana (2021-present)
The company's most complex livery is unveiled in 2021 with the introduction of its newest vessel, 2GO Maligaya, and later, 2GO Masagana. The livery was overhauled giving the ships a much modern and festive appearance. Although still dominated with white and magenta colors, the new livery now features several colorful shapes scattered around the vessel representing 2GO's brand identity, core pillars, and values with the “2GO” branding placed near the stern. The bow now features a large wave-like shape painted in magenta with white stripes, with vessels’ names in a new font, painted in different colors akin to a rainbow. It is still unknown if the rest of the fleet will be painted with this version of livery.

Former fleet
Ships that was once part of the fleet of 2GO that were either retired, sunk, or sold for various reasons:

Roll-on/roll-off Ferries

SuperCat fleet
SuperCat was a former part of 2GO Group until it was transferred to Chelsea Logistics Corporation in 2019. SuperCat operates the following vessels:

Incidents

MV St. Thomas Aquinas

On August 16, 2013, at 9 pm as it approached Cebu City's harbor, the MV St. Thomas Aquinas, formerly SuperFerry 2 collided with the cargo ship Sulpicio Express Siete of Sulpicio Lines and sank in 100 feet deep off Talisay, Cebu. The ship was carrying 831 people—715 passengers and 116 crewmembers. 629 people were rescued immediately and as of August 17, 2013, 31 bodies have been recovered leaving 172 unaccounted for. The Sulpicio Express Siete with 36 crew members on board did not sink and returned safely to port. It had a large hole in its bow above the water line, clearly visible in news photos.

MV St. Anthony de Padua

In 2021, MV St. Anthony de Padua was undergoing quarantine in Bauan, Batangas after 28 of the 82 crew members aboard tested positive for the coronavirus disease 2019. There were no known passengers on board the said vessel. The Maritime Industry Authority (MARINA) in CALABARZON suspended the vessel's passenger safety certificate, and Transport Secretary Arthur Tugade tasked MARINA, the Philippine Ports Authority (PPA), and the Philippine Coast Guard (PCG) to investigate possible lapses leading to the incident.

See also
Negros Navigation
Cebu Ferries
Montenegro Lines
Supercat Fast Ferry Corporation (SFFC)
Roble Shipping Inc.
Trans-Asia Shipping Lines
List of shipping companies in the Philippines

References

External links
2GO Travel official website
2GO Group official website

Passenger ships of the Philippines
Shipping companies of the Philippines
Ferry companies of the Philippines
Companies based in Manila